"Sittin' on a Fence" is a song written by Mick Jagger and Keith Richards of the English rock and roll band the Rolling Stones. The song was given to the singing duo Twice as Much, who released it as their debut single in May 1966. This version became a Top 40 hit on the UK Singles Chart, and also received some attention in the United States, where it charted on the Billboard Bubbling Under Hot 100 Singles chart.

Rolling Stones version
The Rolling Stones' version was recorded in December 1965 during the Aftermath sessions, and released first in the United States on the 1967 album Flowers. The song was released in Great Britain in 1969 on the greatest hits album Through the Past, Darkly (Big Hits Vol. 2). The group did not release it as a single.

It is included on the 1972 compilation More Hot Rocks (Big Hits & Fazed Cookies), but as with so much Stones material from 1967, the band has never performed “Sittin' on a Fence” live. Towards the end of the acoustically driven song, a harpsichord, played by Brian Jones, can be heard.

Personnel

According to authors Philippe Margotin and Jean-Michel Guesdon, except where noted:

The Rolling Stones
Mick Jagger vocals
Keith Richards backing vocals, lead acoustic guitar
Brian Jones acoustic rhythm guitar
Bill Wyman bass
Charlie Watts tambourine

Additional musician
Jack Nitzsche harpsichord

References

Sources

External links

The Rolling Stones songs
1966 debut singles
Songs written by Jagger–Richards
Song recordings produced by Andrew Loog Oldham
1966 songs
Immediate Records singles